The 2021 Galaxy Entertainment Macau Guia Race was the Sixth edition of the Macau Guia Race under the TCR Regulations held at Guia Circuit in Macau on 19–21 November 2021. The race was contested with TCR touring cars and run in support of the 2021 edition of the Macau Grand Prix. The race also served as the final round of the 2021 TCR Asia Series.

Teams and drivers
The following teams and drivers are entered into the event:

Results

Qualifying

Qualification Race

Main Race

References

External links 

 TCR Asia Series Official website
 Macau Grand Prix Official website

Macau Guia Race
Macau Guia Race
Macau Guia Race